The 1963 UC Riverside Highlanders football team represented the University of California, Riverside as an independent during the 1963 NCAA College Division football season. Led by Jim Whitley in his fifth and final season as head coach, UC Riverside compiled a record of 1–7–1. The team was outscored by its opponents 224 to 48 for the season and was shut out in six of its nine games. The Highlanders played home games at UCR Athletic Field in Riverside, California.

Whitley finished his tenure at UC Riverside with an overall record of 17–21–2, for a .450 winning percentage.

Schedule

References

UC Riverside
UC Riverside Highlanders football seasons
UC Riverside Highlanders football